The 1986–87 Los Angeles Clippers season was their 17th season in the NBA, their 3rd in Los Angeles. The Clippers finished 12–70 (.146), the worst winning percentage in team history.

Draft picks

Roster
{| class="toccolours" style="font-size: 95%; width: 100%;"
|-
! colspan="2" style="background-color: #CC0033;  color: #FFFFFF; text-align: center;" | Los Angeles Clippers 1986-87 roster
|- style="background-color: #106BB4; color: #FFFFFF;   text-align: center;"
! Players !! Coaches
|-
| valign="top" |
{| class="sortable" style="background:transparent; margin:0px; width:100%;"
! Pos. !! # !! Nat. !! Name !! Ht. !! Wt. !! From
|-

Regular season

Season standings

z - clinched division title
y - clinched division title
x - clinched playoff spot

Record vs. opponents

Game log

Player statistics

Awards and records

Transactions
The Clippers were involved in the following transactions during the 1986–87 season.

Trades

Free agents

Additions

Subtractions

References

Los Angeles Clippers seasons